This is a list of social fraternities and sororities in Puerto Rico.  There are a number of service, professional, and honorary fraternities and sororities from the United States which have chapters in Puerto Rico. The following list is composed of Greek Letter social organizations founded in Puerto Rico, by Puerto Ricans. The large majority don't have chapters outside the island. An exception to this is those organizations that are members of the Concilio Interfraternitario Puertorriqueño de la Florida, the five fraternities that are members of the CIPFI are also members of the "Concilio Interfraternitario de Puerto Rico" along with the two oldest Puerto Rican sororities, those five fraternities and two sororities are considered as being the strongest.

List
The following list is sorted by 'Founding date':

* - Indicates a member of Concilio Interfraternitario de Puerto Rico (Inter-Fraternity Council of Puerto Rico)

See also

 List of Latino Greek-letter organizations
 List of social fraternities and sororities

References

External links
 Picture of members of Phi Iota Psi in Yabucoa, Puerto Rico

Fraternities
Puerto Rico